Spencer Perceval (11 September 1795 – 16 September 1859) was a British Member of Parliament, the eldest son of Prime Minister Spencer Perceval and Jane Wilson. He was also one of the twelve apostles recognized by the movement associated with Edward Irving and known as the Catholic Apostolic Church.

Perceval married Anna Eliza Macleod, and had several children. One daughter, Eleanor Irving Perceval ( 1879), married Sir Alexander Matheson, 1st Baronet. One of his grandsons was Sir Edward Marsh.

Another of his children, John Spencer Perceval, served as a lieutenant in the 1st Waikato Regiment during the Waikato War in New Zealand. He was killed in action during the skirmish at Titi Hill, near Mauku. After he fell, several of his men attempted to move him from the field, but he would not allow this and told the men to "Leave me alone; revenge my death."

References

External links 
 

1795 births
1859 deaths
19th-century apocalypticists
Children of prime ministers of the United Kingdom
Members of the Parliament of the United Kingdom for English constituencies
Members of the Parliament of the United Kingdom for County Clare constituencies (1801–1922)
UK MPs 1818–1820
UK MPs 1826–1830
UK MPs 1830–1831
UK MPs 1831–1832